This is the discography of British band Latin Quarter.

Albums

Studio albums

Compilation albums

Video albums

Singles

References

Discographies of British artists
Pop music group discographies
Rock music group discographies